The Crepidotaceae are a family of basidiomycete fungi.

Taxonomic Details

The Crepidotaceae have recently undergone a revision based on phylogenetic analyses. The following characters are typical of this family:
 saprotrophic on woody or herbaceous matter
 gymnocarpic (having the hymenium open and attached to the surface of the thallus)
 spore prints that are pale yellow to brown
 simple cuticle (although some may have pileocystidia)
 cheilocystidia always present
 spores entire, smooth or ornamented but never angular or reticulate

References

 
Agaricales families